The 2020–21 Elon Phoenix men's basketball team represented Elon University during the 2020–21 NCAA Division I men's basketball season. The Phoenix, led by second-year head coach Mike Schrage, play as seventh-year members of the Colonial Athletic Association and play their home games at the Schar Center.

Previous season

The Phoenix finished the 2019–20 season 13–21, 7–11 in CAA play to finish in seventh place. They played in the 2020 CAA men's basketball tournament, where they defeated 10seed James Madison in the first round, upset 2seed William & Mary in the quarterfinals, and lost to 6seed Northeastern in the semifinals.

Offseason

Departures

Incoming transfers

2020 recruiting class

Roster

Schedule and results

Elon has had to cancel three games and postpone nine games due to COVID-19.

|-
!colspan=9 style=| Nonconference season 

|-
!colspan=9 style=| CAA regular season

|-
!colspan=12 style=| CAA tournament

Source

References

Elon Phoenix men's basketball seasons
Elon
Elon